Polymacon is a non-proprietary (i.e., generic) term for a hydrophilic polymer of 2-hydroxyethylmethacrylate (HEMA) cross-linked with ethylene glycol dimethacrylate (62%) and water (38%).  It is used in the manufacture of soft contact lenses, and is considered a low hydration hydrogel of nonionic polymer.

References

Organic polymers